Alteromonas marina is a marine bacterium.

External links
 
Type strain of Alteromonas marina at BacDive -  the Bacterial Diversity Metadatabase

Alteromonadales
Bacteria described in 2003